Kartashov is a Russian masculine surname, its feminine counterpart is Kartashova. It may refer to:

Alena Kartashova (born 1982), Russian wrestler 
Anatoly Kartashov (1937–2005), Russian water polo player 
Anatoly Kartashov (cosmonaut) (1932–2005), Soviet cosmonaut 
Maksim Kartashov, Kazakhstani journalist
Vladimir Kartashov (1957–2002), Russian artist 
Vyacheslav Kartashov (born 1966), Russian football player

See also
Anton Kartashev (1875–1960), Russian historian

Russian-language surnames